Narach) is a village in Myadzyel District, Minsk Region, Belarus, by the Lake Narach.

It was earlier known as the village of Kobylnik or Kobylniki.

It is the birthplace of Maria Kaczyńska, who was the First Lady of Poland from 2005 until her death in 2010.

Religion

Churches
Church of Saint Andrew Babola

References

Villages in Belarus
Populated places in Minsk Region
Myadzyel District
Sventsyansky Uyezd
Wilno Voivodeship (1926–1939)